The  was a class of four destroyers of the Imperial Japanese Navy.

Background
These destroyers were intended to operate with the new series of fast and powerful cruisers also under consideration as part of a program intended to give the Imperial Japanese Navy a qualitative edge with the world's most modern ships. The new vessels were built from 1931-1933.

Design
The main difference in design between the Akatsuki vessels and the standard Fubuki-class was the use of a new high-pressure boiler, which enabled the number of boilers to be reduced from four to three without a reduction in power. This also enabled the fore smokestack to be made narrower than on standard Fubuki-class vessels, and this feature was the most evident visual recognition feature between the two designs. Other improvements over the Fubuki class included a larger bridge structure, with the addition of another level to house improved fire control facilities, and a splinter-proof torpedo launcher/turret, which allowed the torpedo launcher tubes to be reloaded in action.

However, the Akatsuki class shared a number of inherent design problems with the Fubuki class. The large amount of armament combined with a smaller hull displacement than in the original design created issues with stability. After the Tomozuru Incident, in which the basic design of many Japanese warships was called into question, additional ballast had to be added. In the Fourth Fleet Incident, during which a typhoon damaged virtually every ship in the Fourth Fleet, issues with the longitudinal strength of the Akatsuki-class hull was discovered. As a result, all vessels were reconstructed from 1935-1937. An additional 40 tons of ballast was added, the bridge reduced in size and the height of the smoke stacks was decreased. The number of torpedo reloads were reduced from nine to three (for the center launcher only), and fewer shells were stored for the guns. The amount of fuel carried was also increased to help lower the center-of-gravity. This increased the displacement to 2050 tons standard tons and over 2400 tons full load. The rebuild reduced the top speed slightly to 34 knots.

Armament
The main battery consisted of six Type 3 127 mm 50 caliber naval guns, mounted in pairs in three weather-proof, splinter-proof, gas-tight gun turrets . These guns were dual purpose guns that could be elevated to 75 degrees, making them the world's first destroyers with this ability.  Ammunition was brought up on hoists from magazines located directly underneath each gun turret, which had a far greater rate of fire than those of other contemporary destroyers in which ammunition was typically manually loaded.   However, the gun houses were not bullet-proof, and were thus actually still gun mounts, rather than proper turrets.

The three triple  torpedo launchers used on the standard Fubuki-class retained, and originally Type 8 torpedoes were carried. These were later replaced with the famous Type 93 "Long Lance" oxygen-propelled torpedoes during World War II.

Anti-aircraft capability was initially two Type 93 13 mm AA Guns mounted in front of the second stack. These vessels also lost one of their aft guns in April 1944 in exchange for two triple Type 96 guns, and another pair of triple Type 96 guns was added between the aft torpedo mounts. Hibiki had another 20 single-mount Type 96s added, as well as a Type 22 and Type 13 radar, before the end of the war.

Operational history
Of the four Akatsuki class vessels, only Hibiki survived the war, and was awarded as a prize of war to the Soviet Navy, and continued to be used a floating barracks ship until retirement in 1953. Eventually, she was used as target-practice in the 1970s, where she was finally sunk.  was lost at the Naval Battle of Guadalcanal in November 1942, where she was sunk by American cruiser and destroyer gunfire.

List of Ships

Type III (Akatsuki)

See also
List of ship classes of the Second World War

Notes

References

Books

External links

Pacific War Online Encyclopedia

 

Destroyer classes
 
World War II destroyers of Japan